José Antonio Rodríguez Aldea (August 6, 1779 – June 3, 1841) was a Chilean politician.

1779 births
1841 deaths
Members of the Senate of Chile